Justina Blakeney is an American designer, artist, interior designer, writer, and speaker who is well-known by the bright colorful and vibrant bohemian style. She founded a houseware and home decoration brand Jungalow. Her first book, The New Bohemians: Cool and Collected Homes, was a New York Times bestseller.

Early life and education 
Blakeney grew up in Berkeley, California. Her mother is of Eastern European Jewish descent and her father is of African-American and Native American descent, as well as Irish and French. Blakeney was raised Jewish and her father was a convert to Judaism. Her mother's family were Jewish immigrants to New Jersey at the turn of the century. Her family celebrated the Jewish holidays, including Hanukkah and Passover, and did not celebrate Christmas like some other secular Jewish families they knew. She states that this multi-ethnic background and California upbringing influenced her bohemian aesthetic.

She graduated from UCLA in 2001 with a B.A. in World Arts and Cultures. In her junior year of university, she went to Italy to study fashion and communication. The experience in Italy made her move back to Italy after graduation, and enrolled in Polimoda-a fashion school.

Career 
Blakeney named her design and lifestyle blog "Jungalow," a combination of jungle and bungalow. Using the blog and social media as platforms, Blakeney created a collection of shaggy rugs for Loloi, a wallpaper collection with boutique firm Hygge & West, the Justina Blakeney Home collection with Anthropologie, a bedding line at Target, and a home fabrics collection with Calico Corners stores. She has a line at Living Spaces, and a collection of bedding, storage, lighting, and small gifts for Pottery Barn Kids.

Her designs for fashion retailer Moda Operandi, including portraits of fashion icons such as Grace Jones, were featured in Vogue Magazine.

Books
Her first book, The New Bohemians: Cool and Collected Homes book, was released in 2015. The New Bohemians: Come Home to Good Vibes, was released in October 2017. They are coffee table books with design photos featuring residences, and includes resources such as houseplant guides and project instructions.

Speaking 
 Alt Summit
 Makers Summit
 AIGA Design Conference: Business + Entrepreneurship
 Design Bloggers Conference
 WITHIT
 Pinterests' Knit Con
 Creative Mornings

Personal life 
Blakeney lives with her husband and daughter in a 1926 bungalow located in the Frogtown neighborhood of Los Angeles. Her husband is an atheist born to an Eastern European Jewish father and an Irish Catholic mother. Her home was featured in interior decorating magazine House Beautiful.

References 

Living people
African-American Jews
Writers from Los Angeles
Writers from Berkeley, California
University of California, Los Angeles alumni
American Ashkenazi Jews
21st-century American women writers
African-American designers
African-American women artists
American textile designers
1979 births
21st-century African-American women writers
21st-century African-American writers
20th-century African-American people
20th-century African-American women